Endoxyla affinis is a species of moth of the family Cossidae. It is found in Australia, where it has been recorded from Queensland and New South Wales.

The wingspan is about 160 mm. The forewings are dark grey with a dark patch. There are dark lines on each side of the thorax.

References

Moths described in 1896
Endoxyla (moth)